Redlichia takooensis is a species of redlichiid trilobite from the lower Cambrian-aged Emu Shale of Kangaroo Island, Australia.

References

 
 
 
 
 

Redlichioidea
Cambrian trilobites
Fossil taxa described in 1950
Emu Bay Shale